Stefany Coronado (born 16 September 1996) is a Bolivian race walker. She competed in the women's 20 kilometres walk event at the 2016 Summer Olympics, where she finished in 43rd place with a time of 1:37:56.

References

External links
 

1996 births
Living people
Bolivian female racewalkers
Athletes (track and field) at the 2016 Summer Olympics
Olympic athletes of Bolivia
Sportspeople from La Paz